Mavisbank is a country house outside Loanhead, south of Edinburgh in Midlothian, Scotland. It was designed by architect William Adam in collaboration with his client, Sir John Clerk of Penicuik, and was constructed between 1723 and 1727. The first Palladian villa in Scotland, it is described by Historic Scotland as "one of Scotland's most important country houses". It was altered in the 19th century, but suffered decades of neglect in the 20th century. The interiors were gutted by fire in 1973, and the house remains a ruin. , plans exist to partially restore the building and manage the estate as a community asset.

Design and construction
 Sir John Clerk's father, the first Baronet of Penicuik, planned a house on the Mavisbank estate in the late 17th century, for which a drawing of 1698 survives. Sir John Clerk, 2nd Baronet (1676–1755) was a Member of the Parliament of Scotland, and, after the union of 1707, of the Parliament of Great Britain. He was also an artistic patron, a composer of music, and an amateur architect. In 1722, he inherited his father's estates, and began planning the new house. Around this time, William Adam was engaged on his first major commission, the remodelling of Hopetoun House for the Earl of Hopetoun. Clerk and Adam collaborated on the design of Mavisbank, which was based on the 1698 proposal. Each claimed the greater part of the credit for the design. Clerk wrote in a letter that he designed the house "under the correction of Mr Adam, a talented architect", while Adam credited the design to himself in his book, Vitruvius Scoticus. It is clear that Adam enjoyed an unusually close relationship with his client, despite their differences of opinion. Clerk certainly criticised some of Adam's suggestions, although surviving correspondence suggests Adam got his way on a number of points. The foundations were laid in 1723, with construction entrusted to the mason and contractor John Baxter Senior, with stone carved by William Sylverstyne. However, William Adam himself was later appointed to complete the works.

Garden

A brick-lined walled garden was built in 1739 in a circular form based on the Colosseum.

Later history and decline
The house passed out of the Clerk family in 1815. In 1840, the house was extended, possibly to designs by Thomas Hamilton, the symmetrical additions including a ballroom. The building became an asylum in 1876. Additions were made to the front of the pavilions in the 1880s. Further extensions were made in the 1920s, but in 1946, Dr W. M. Harrowes, Medical Superintendent for Edinburgh purchased the property, and demolished all the additions made since the 18th century. In 1954 he commissioned Robert Hurd to restore the building but much of the intended restoration of the house went unrealised.

In the late 1950s, the forecourt was used as a car park for cars both used and scrap by local man Archie Stevenson, and further neglect set in. The building was gutted by fire in 1973, destroying the roof and interiors. In 1986, Mr Stevenson was evicted from Mavisbank along with several other people who stayed in caravans on the property. Ownership of the house remained uncertain, however, as Stevenson had sold portions of the property to three possibly fictitious persons in the United States. In July 2008, Historic Scotland was still pursuing compulsory purchase of the building.

Restoration proposals
Previous stabilisation work was carried out in the 1980s under emergency powers, following the threatened demolition of the structure. The Mavisbank Trust, a subsidiary of Edinburgh & Lothians Greenspace Trust, was formed in 2002 to explore longer-term solutions for the restoration of the house and grounds. In August 2003, Mavisbank was featured in the BBC Television programme Restoration, in which the public were invited to vote for restoration proposals. Mavisbank reached the final round, but lost out to Manchester's Victoria Baths. In 2008, Historic Scotland examined two options: stabilisation of the building as a ruin; or creation of a "developer's shell", which could be sold and completed by a third party. The Mavisbank Trust continues to work with the community, Historic Scotland, Midlothian Council and Edinburgh & Lothians Greenspace Trust to find a sustainable future for Mavisbank which respects its natural and built heritage value whilst providing greater access to the local communities. A local campaign group, Friends of Mavisbank, has been formed with the aim of promoting  some limited architectural intervention, while improving public access to the estate.

In 2016, Historical Environment Scotland removed Mavisbank House and garden from their Scheduled Ancient Monument list.

See also
Mavis Bank, a historic coffee estate (and eponymous small town) in Jamaica named after Mavisbank House.

Notes

References
Colvin, Howard, (1978) A Biographical Dictionary of British Architects, 1600–1840, John Murray
Fleming, John (1962) Robert Adam and His Circle, John Murray
Gifford, John (1989) William Adam 1689–1748, Mainstream Publishing / RIAS

External links
Mavisbank Trust
Friends of Mavisbank
Mavisbank House, Gazetteer for Scotland
Mavisbank House, Midlothian, RCAHMS "Treasured Places"
Mavisbank House Fine Art Photo Project Mike Steven Photography

Houses completed in 1727
Category A listed buildings in Midlothian
Listed houses in Scotland
William Adam buildings
Country houses in Midlothian
Inventory of Gardens and Designed Landscapes
Ruins in Midlothian
Bonnyrigg and Lasswade